Avtandil Kapanadze (born 1 December 1962) is a Soviet/Georgian striker.

He has a twin brother Tariel Kapanadze who is also a football player.

External links
 
 

1962 births
Living people
Footballers from Tbilisi
Footballers from Georgia (country)
Expatriate footballers from Georgia (country)
Expatriate footballers in Ukraine
Expatriate sportspeople from Georgia (country) in Ukraine
Expatriate footballers in Russia
Soviet footballers
Ukrainian Premier League players
FC Nyva Ternopil players
FC Temp Shepetivka players
FC Metalurgi Rustavi players
FC Torpedo Kutaisi players
FC Guria Lanchkhuti players
Twins from Georgia (country)
Twin sportspeople
Georgian emigrants to Russia
Association football forwards
FC Lokomotiv Nizhny Novgorod players